This is a list of former pupils of Glenalmond College in Perthshire, Scotland. They are known in some circles as "Old Glenalmonds".

A 
 John Adams (Royal Navy officer)
 David Anderson (judge)
 John Archibald
 Ian Campbell, 12th Duke of Argyll
 Torquhil Campbell, 13th Duke of Argyll
 Phil Ashby

B 
 Anthony Babington (politician)
 Leslie Banks
 H. M. Bateman, Cartoonist
 Dennison Berwick
 Sir Ernley Robertson Hay Blackwell – lawyer and civil servant
 Crispin Bonham-Carter
 Carly Booth
 Victor Bruce, 9th Earl of Elgin – Viceroy of India
 Alick Buchanan-Smith – politician
 Turtle Bunbury, historian and author

C 
 John Cameron, Lord Abernethy
 Dallas Campbell
 Duncan Campbell – journalist and author
 Torquhil Campbell, 13th Duke of Argyll
 Alexander Cockburn
 Andrew Cockburn
 Patrick Cockburn
 Robbie Coltrane
 Sir Ninian Comper
 Edward Hubert Cunningham Craig FRSE geologist and cartographer
 Sir James Crichton-Browne – Lord Chancellor's Visitor in Lunacy 1875 – 1922
 James Cuthbertson – poet

D 
 Logie Danson
 Beauchamp Duff

E 
 Victor Bruce, 9th Earl of Elgin
 Derek Emslie, Lord Kingarth
 Nigel Emslie, Lord Emslie, former judge on the Supreme Courts of Scotland

F 
 Charles Falconer, Baron Falconer of Thoroton – former Lord Chancellor and Secretary of State for Constitutional Affairs
 John Fauvel – historian of mathematics

G 
 Sandy Gall – former ITN newscaster
 Christopher Geidt
 Georg Friedrich, Prince of Prussia
 Sir John Gilmour, 2nd Baronet – politician
 Francis Gregory (bishop)

H 
 Dougie Hall – rugby player 
 Jonathan Hammond – Olympic shooter
 John Hannah (Dean of Chichester)
 Patrick Hodge, Lord Hodge
 Gerald Howat – historian, teacher and cricket writer

J 
 William Milbourne James
 Rupert Jeffcoat
 Alister Jack

K 
 Phil Kay – comedian
 J. D. Kellie-MacCallum
 James Kennaway – novelist
 Miles Kington – writer and humorist
 William Kington – cricketer
 Norman Boyd Kinnear

L 
 Graham Laidler - 'Pont of Punch' - cartoonist
 David Leslie – rugby player
 David Litchfield – writer
 Schomberg Kerr, 9th Marquess of Lothian
 Maurice Lyell
 Joseph Leycester Lyne – preacher
Sir Charles Stewart Loch - Secretary of the Charity Organisation Society

M 
 Malcolm MacColl – clergyman and publicist
 Andrew Macdonald (producer)
 Kevin Macdonald – film director
 Henry Macintosh
 Thomas Mackay
 Alastair Mackenzie – actor
 Hugh Malcolm
 Alexander Mann – German bobsledder
 Alex Massie (journalist)
 Allan Massie – journalist and writer
 Frederick Matheson
 William Matthews (engineer)
 Duncan Menzies, Lord Menzies
 John Michie – actor
 Reginald Mitchell-Innes
 Ander Monro – rugby player
 James Wolfe-Murray

P 
 Duncan Vernon Pirie
 Gilbert E. Primrose
 Sir Henry Primrose (1846–1923), Scottish civil servant who became chairman of the board of Inland Revenue
 John Purvis – Conservative MEP

R 
 Keith Raffan
 George Rickey – sculptor
 Walter Robberds
 James Robertson (novelist)
 Michael Rodd – TV presenter
 Vincent Rorison
 Frederick Campbell Rose
 Alex Russell (golfer)

S 
 George Sayer
 James Stewart-Mackenzie, 1st Baron Seaforth
 Graham Stuart, politician
 Dr Richard Simpson – Labour Member of the Scottish Parliament and former Justice Minister
 Noel Skelton – politician
 Arthur Wallace Skrine
 David Sole - rugby player
 Dennis Stevenson, Baron Stevenson of Coddenham
 Sir Nairne Stewart Sandeman, 1st Baronet
 Kenneth Strong
 Douglas Sutherland

T 
 Hon. Richard Tedder FRCP - virologist and microbiologist
 Adair Turner, Baron Turner of Ecchinswell – businessman, Chairman of Financial Services Authority

W 
 Rob Wainwright – rugby player, former Scotland captain
 William Campbell Walker
 Clement Wilson (writer)
 David Wilson, Baron Wilson of Tillyorn – diplomat and colonial administrator
 John Wilson (priest)
 John Wolfe-Barry
 Francis Wyatt (cricketer)

References 

Glenalmond